Cream of Comedy was an annual award show broadcast by The Comedy Network that promoted emerging Canadian comedic talent in the early stage of their careers. The show was established in the memory of Toronto comedic performer Tim Sims and has raised significant annual contributions for the Tim Sims Encouragement Fund Award (TSEF).

Contestants included various comedy acts (often stand-up comics and character performers but also improvisers, duos, musicians and sketch troupes). A jury of comedy professionals would choose five finalists from a larger field of entrants/contestants to perform in the televised showcase. The Cream of Comedy special featured clips and 15-minute comedy performances by these five finalists, taped before a live audience for broadcast. The jury kept the winners' names strictly confidential until they were announced at the end of the Cream of Comedy special taping, and then the winners were presented with the Tim Sims Award, $5,000 and (in later years) a scholarship to the Toronto Second City Training Centre.

The show started in 1996 when The Second City's Toronto location donated its venue for the event. Four people donated money to begin the TSEF.  The event was considered a training ground for relatively young comics, providing them national exposure for their talent. Past winners have included Gavin Crawford, Nathan Fielder, Ron Sparks, Katie Crown and Fraser Young.

Patrick McKenna hosted the inaugural show and returned to host again in 2002.  That year, the jury became hopelessly deadlocked and so two winners were named:  Tim Polley and Brad Hurt.  To avoid this in the future, a new rule was made giving a tie-breaking vote to comedian Lindsay Leese, widow of Tim Sims and founder of the TSEF.

1998 winner Gavin Crawford and 2000 nominee Aurora Browne returned to co-host the show in 2006.  2005 winner Jeff McEnery hosted the show in 2014.

On October 26, 2015, Toronto's Second City staged the last Cream of Comedy show. It was the award event's 20th year.

References

External links
Cream of Comedy at The Comedy Network
Cream of Comedy at Imdb
 http://www.theage.com.au/articles/2003/11/26/1069825832918.html
 http://www.blogto.com/arts/2013/10/this_week_in_comedy_cream_of_comedy_laugh_sabbath_monkey_toast_and_the_dark_comedy_fest/

Canadian television specials